The men's K-2 500 metres sprint canoeing competition at the 2002 Asian Games in Busan was held on 12 October 2002 at the Nakdong River.

Schedule 
All times are Korea Standard Time (UTC+09:00)

Results

References 

2002 Asian Games Official Reports, Page 346

External links 
Official Website

Men's K-2 0500 metres